is a district of Machida, Tokyo, Japan. The current administrative place names are Nakamachi 1-chome to 4-chome.

References

Districts of Machida, Tokyo